This is a list of the Japanese species of the superfamilies  Bombycoidea and Geometroidea. It also acts as an index to the species articles and forms part of the full List of moths of Japan.

Lasiocampidae
 ウスズミカレハ  — Poecilocampa tamanukii Matsumura, 1928
 カレハガ  — Gastropacha orientalis Sheljuzhko, 1943
 ホシカレハ  — Gastropacha populifolia angustipennis Walker, 1855
 ヒロバカレハ  — Gastropacha quercifolia cerridifolia Felder & Felder, 1862
 ワタナベカレハ  — Gastropacha watanabei Okano, 1966
 ヒメカレハ  — Phyllodesma japonicus japonicus (Leech, [1889])
 タカムクカレハ北海道亜種  — Cosmotriche lobulina pinivora (Matsumura, 1927)
 タカムクカレハ本州亜種  — Cosmotriche lobulina takamukuana (Matsumura, 1921)
 ウスマダラカレハ  — Pyrosis idiota Graeser, 1888
 タケカレハ  — Euthrix albomaculata directa (Swinhoe, 1892)
 タケヒメカレハ  — Euthrix laeta sulphurea (Aurivillius, 1895)
 ヨシカレハ  — Euthrix potatoria bergmani (Bryk, 1941)
 ギンモンカレハ本土亜種  — Somadasys brevivenis brevivenis (Butler, 1885)
 ギンモンカレハ屋久島亜種  — Somadasys brevivenis yakushimensis Okano, 1965
 スカシカレハ  — Amurilla subpurpurea subpurpurea (Butler, 1881)
 リンゴカレハ  — Odonestis pruni japonensis Tams, 1935
 マツカレハ  — Dendrolimus spectabilis (Butler, 1877)
 ツガカレハ  — Dendrolimus superans (Butler, 1877)
 ムラクモカレハ  — Lebeda nobilis Walker, 1855
 クヌギカレハ屋久島以北亜種  — Kunugia undans flaveola (Motschulsky, 1866)
 クヌギカレハ琉球亜種  — Kunugia undans iwasakii (Nagano, 1917)
 ヤマダカレハ  — Kunugia yamadai Nagano, 1917
 ミヤケカレハ  — Takanea excisa (Wileman, 1910)
 シカタカレハ  — Malacosoma dentatum Mell, 1938
 オビカレハ  — Malacosoma neustrium testaceum (Motschulsky, 1861)

Eupterotidae
 オビガ  — Apha aequalis (Felder, 1874)

Bombycidae
 クワコ  — Bombyx mandarina (Moore, 1872)
 カイコ  — Bombyx mori (Linnaeus, 1758)
 オオクワゴモドキ  — Oberthueria falcigera (Butler, 1878)
 カギバモドキ  — Pseudandraca gracilis (Butler, 1885)
 スカシサン  — Prismosticta hyalinata Butler, 1885
 テンオビシロカサン  — Ernolatia moorei (Hutton, 1865)
 イチジクカサン  — Trilocha varians (Walker, 1855)

Saturniidae
 ヨナグニサン  — Attacus atlas ryukyuensis Inoue, 1993
 シンジュサン本州以西対馬以外亜種  — Samia cynthia pryeri (Butler, 1878)
 エリサン  — Samia cynthia ricini Donovan
 シンジュサン北海道・対馬亜種  — Samia cynthia walkeri (Felder & Felder, 1862)
 サクサン  — Antheraea pernyi (Guérin-Méneville, 1855)
 ヤママユ北海道亜種  — Antheraea yamamai ussuriensis Schachbazov, 1953
 ヤママユ本州以南屋久島以北亜種  — Antheraea yamamai yamamai (Guérin-Méneville, 1861)
 ヤママユ奄美以南亜種  — Antheraea yamamai yoshimotoi Inoue, 1965
 クスサン屋久島以北亜種  — Saturnia japonica japonica (Moore, 1872)
 クスサン奄美以南亜種  — Saturnia japonica ryukyuensis (Inoue, 1984)
 ヒメヤママユ北海道亜種  — Saturnia jonasii fallax Jordan, 1911
 ヒメヤママユ本州以南亜種  — Saturnia jonasii jonasii (Butler, 1877)
 ウスタビガ北海道亜種  — Rhodinia fugax diana (Oberthür, 1886)
 ウスタビガ本州以南亜種  — Rhodinia fugax fugax (Butler, 1877)
 クロウスタビガ本州亜種  — Rhodinia jankowskii hattoriae Inoue, 1965
 クロウスタビガ北海道亜種  — Rhodinia jankowskii hokkaidoensis Inoue, 1965
 ハグルマヤママユ  — Loepa sakaei Inoue, 1965
 オオミズアオ本州以南亜種  — Actias aliena aliena (Butler, 1879)
 オオミズアオ北海道亜種  — Actias aliena sjoeqvisti Bryk, 1949
 オナガミズアオ本州・九州亜種  — Actias gnoma gnoma (Butler, 1877)
 オナガミズアオ北海道亜種  — Actias gnoma mandschurica (Staudinger, 1892)
 オナガミズアオ伊豆諸島亜種  — Actias gnoma miyatai Inoue, 1976
 エゾヨツメ北海道亜種  — Aglia japonica japonica Leech, [1889]
 エゾヨツメ本州以南亜種  — Aglia japonica microtau Inoue, 1958

Brahmaeidae
 イボタガ  — Brahmaea japonica Butler, 1873

Sphingidae
 フトオビホソバスズメ  — Ambulyx japonica japonica Rothschild, 1894
 ホソバスズメ  — Ambulyx ochracea Butler, 1885
 モンホソバスズメ  — Ambulyx schauffelbergeri Bremer & Grey, 1853
 アジアホソバスズメ  — Ambulyx sericeipennis tobii (Inoue, 1976)
 トビイロスズメ  — Clanis bilineata tsingtauica Mell, 1922
 ハガタスズメ  — Polyptychus chinensis Rothschild & Jordan, 1903
 モモスズメ  — Marumba gaschkewitschii echephron (Boisduval, [1875])
 ヒメクチバスズメ  — Marumba jankowskii Oberthür, 1880
 タイワンクチバスズメ  — Marumba saishiuana saishiuana Okamoto, 1924
 クチバスズメ  — Marumba sperchius sperchius (Ménétriès, 1857)
 オオシモフリスズメ  — Langia zenzeroides nawai Rothschild & Jordan, 1903
 ギンボシスズメ  — Parum colligata (Walker, 1856)
 ヒサゴスズメ  — Mimas christophi (Staudinger, 1887)
 ウンモンスズメ  — Callambulyx tatarinovii gabyae Bryk, 1946
 ヒメウチスズメ  — Smerinthus caecus Ménétriès, 1957
 ウチスズメ  — Smerinthus planus planus Walker, 1856
 コウチスズメ  — Smerinthus tokyonis Matsumura, 1921
 ノコギリスズメ  — Laothoe amurensis amurensis (Staudinger, 1892)
 エゾスズメ  — Phyllosphingia dissimilis dissimilis (Bremer, 1861)
 エビガラスズメ  — Agrius convolvuli (Linnaeus, 1758)
 クロメンガタスズメ  — Acherontia lachesis (Fabricius, 1798)
 メンガタスズメ  — Acherontia styx medusa Moore, [1858]
 エゾシモフリスズメ  — Meganoton analis scribae (Austaut, 1911)
 シモフリスズメ  — Psilogramma incretum (Walker, 1865)
 クロスズメ  — Sphinx caliginea caliginea (Butler, 1877)
 コエビガラスズメ  — Sphinx constricta Butler, 1885
 オビグロスズメ北海道亜種  — Sphinx crassistriga aino Kishida, 1990
 オビグロスズメ本州亜種  — Sphinx crassistriga crassistriga (Rothschild & Jordan, 1903)
 エゾコエビガラスズメ  — Sphinx ligustri Linnaeus, 1758
 マツクロスズメ対馬亜種  — Sphinx morio aresta (Jordan, 1931)
 マツクロスズメ北海道亜種  — Sphinx morio inouei (Owada & Kogi, 1993)
 マツクロスズメ本州亜種  — Sphinx morio morio (Rothschild & Jordan, 1903)
 ヒメサザナミスズメ  — Dolbina exacta Staudinger, 1892
 タイワンサザナミスズメ  — Dolbina inexacta (Walker, 1856)
 サザナミスズメ  — Dolbina tancrei Staudinger, 1887
 クロテンケンモンスズメ  — Kentochrysalis consimilis Rothschild & Jordan, 1903
 クロスキバホウジャク  — Hemaris affinis (Bremer, 1861)
 スキバホウジャク  — Hemaris radians (Walker, 1856)
 オオスカシバ  — Cephonodes hylas hylas (Linnaeus, 1771)
 リュウキュウオオスカシバ  — Cephonodes xanthus Rothschild & Jordan, 1903
 トモエスズメ  — Daphnis hypothous hypothous (Cramer, 1780)
 キョウチクトウスズメ  — Daphnis nerii (Linnaeus, 1758)
 クルマスズメ屋久島亜種  — Ampelophaga rubiginosa lohita Kishida & Yano, 2001
 クルマスズメ九州以北亜種  — Ampelophaga rubiginosa rubiginosa Bremer & Grey, 1853
 ブドウスズメ  — Acosmeryx castanea Rothschild & Jordan, 1903
 ハネナガブドウスズメ  — Acosmeryx naga naga (Moore, 1858)
 ホシヒメホウジャク  — Neogurelca himachala sangaica (Butler, 1875)
 ヒメホウジャク  — Neogurelca hyas (Walker, 1856)
 ヒメクロホウジャク  — Macroglossum bombylans Boisduval, [1875]
 オキナワクロホウジャク  — Macroglossum corythus platyxanthum Rothschild & Jordan, 1903
 オキナワネグロホウジャク  — Macroglossum faro (Cramer, 1780)
 フリッツェホウジャク  — Macroglossum fritzei Rothschild & Jordan, 1903
 イチモンジホウジャク  — Macroglossum heliophilum Boisduval, [1875]
 シロオビホウジャク  — Macroglossum mediovitta Rothschild & Jordan, 1903
 チビホウジャク  — Macroglossum neotroglodytus Kitching & Cadiou, 2000
 オキナワホウジャク  — Macroglossum passalus passalus (Drury, 1773)
 オビホウジャク  — Macroglossum poecilum Rothschild & Jordan, 1903
 ホシホウジャク  — Macroglossum pyrrhosticta Butler, 1875
 クロホウジャク  — Macroglossum saga Butler, 1878
 クロオビホウジャク  — Macroglossum sitiene (Walker, 1856)
 ホウジャク  — Macroglossum stellatarum (Linnaeus, 1758)
 イブキスズメ  — Hyles gallii (Rottemburg, 1775)
 アカオビスズメ  — Hyles livornica (Esper, 1779)
 ヒメスズメ  — Deilephila askoldensis (Oberthür, 1879)
 ベニスズメ  — Deilephila elpenor lewisii (Butler, 1875)
 コシタベニスズメ  — Hippotion boerhaviae (Fabricius, 1775)
 シタベニセスジスズメ  — Hippotion celerio (Linnaeus, 1758)
 モトグロシタベニスズメ  — Hippotion echeclus (Boisduval, [1875])
 マメシタベニスズメ  — Hippotion rosetta Swinhoe, 1892
 オバナワスズメ  — Hippotion velox (Fabricius, 1793)
 シタベニスズメ  — Theretra alecto alecto (Linnaeus, 1758)
 サツマスズメ  — Theretra clotho clotho (Drury, 1773)
 コスズメ  — Theretra japonica (Boisduval, 1869)
 キイロスズメ  — Theretra nessus (Drury, 1773)
 セスジスズメ  — Theretra oldenlandiae oldenlandiae (Fabricius, 1775)
 イッポンセスジスズメ  — Theretra silhetensis silhetensis (Walker, 1856)
 タイワンベニスズメ  — Theretra suffusa (Walker, 1856)
 ミドリスズメ  — Pergesa acteus (Cramer, 1779)
 ビロードスズメ  — Rhagastis mongoliana (Butler, 1875)
 ミスジビロードスズメ  — Rhagastis trilineata Matsumura, 1921

Uraniidae
 シロフタオ  — Eversmannia exornata exornata (Eversmann, 1837)
 キスジシロフタオ  — Dysaethria cretacea (Butler, 1881)
 マエモンフタオ  — Dysaethria erasaria (Christoph, 1881)
 ハガタフタオ  — Dysaethria flavistriga (Warren, 1901)
 シタクロオビフタオ  — Dysaethria fulvihamata (Hampson, 1912)
 ヒメクロホシフタオ  — Dysaethria illotata (Christoph, 1880)
 ミナミクロホシフタオ  — Dysaethria meridiana (Inoue, 1982)
 クロホシフタオ  — Dysaethria moza (Butler, 1878)
 アトシロオビフタオ  — Europlema desistaria (Walker, 1861)
 クロテンシロフタオ  — Europlema nivosaria (Walker, 1866)
 オキナワフタオ  — Europlema semibrunnea (Pagenstecher, 1888)
 カバイロフタオ  — Oroplema oyamana (Matsumura, 1931)
 クロオビシロフタオ  — Oroplema plagifera (Butler, 1881)
 クロフタオ  — Epiplema styx (Butler, 1881)
 アトキフタオ小笠原以外亜種  — Warreniplema fumicosta fumicosta (Warren, 1896)
 アトキフタオ小笠原亜種  — Warreniplema fumicosta islandica Inoue, 1996
 マルバネフタオ  — Monobolodes prunaria (Moore, [1877])
 コモンマルバネフタオ  — Phazaca alikangensis (Strand, 1916)
 アマミマルバネフタオ  — Phazaca kosemponicola (Strand, 1916)
 アサケマルバネフタオ  — Phazaca theclata (Guenée, 1857)
 エグリフタオ  — Chundana emarginatus (Hampson, 1891)
 ギンツバメ  — Acropteris iphiata (Guenée, 1857)
 サキシマギンツバメ  — Acropteris sparsaria (Walker, 1861)
 ヤクシマギンツバメ  — Pseudomicronia advocataria (Walker, 1861)
 オオツバメガ  — Lyssa zampa (Butler, 1869)

Geometridae
 クロフカバシャク  — Archiearis notha okanoi (Inoue, 1958)
 カバシャク北海道亜種  — Archiearis parthenias bella (Inoue, 1955)
 カバシャク本州亜種  — Archiearis parthenias elegans (Inoue, 1955)
 スギタニシロエダシャク  — Abraxas flavisinuata Warren, 1894
 ミナミマダラエダシャク  — Abraxas formosilluminata Inoue, 1984
 クロマダラエダシャク  — Abraxas fulvobasalis Warren, 1894
 スグリシロエダシャク  — Abraxas grossulariata conspurcata Butler, 1878
 ヒトスジマダラエダシャク  — Abraxas latifasciata Warren, 1894
 ユウマダラエダシャク琉球亜種  — Abraxas miranda aesia Prout, 1925
 ユウマダラエダシャク本土亜種  — Abraxas miranda miranda Butler, 1878
 ヒメマダラエダシャク  — Abraxas niphonibia Wehrli, 1935
 ヘリグロマダラエダシャク  — Abraxas satoi Inoue, 1972
 キタマダラエダシャク  — Abraxas sylvata microtate Wehrli, 1931
 シロオビヒメエダシャク北海道亜種  — Lomaspilis marginata amurensis (Hedemann, 1881)
 シロオビヒメエダシャク本州以南亜種  — Lomaspilis marginata opis Butler, 1878
 キブサヒメエダシャク  — Ligdia ciliaria Leech, 1897
 シロスジヒメエダシャク  — Ligdia japonaria Leech, 1897
 クロフヒメエダシャク  — Peratophyga hyalinata grata (Butler, 1879)
 サザナミオビエダシャク  — Heterostegane hyriaria Warren, 1894
 フタホシシロエダシャク  — Lomographa bimaculata subnotata (Warren, 1895)
 オオフタスジシロエダシャク  — Lomographa claripennis Inoue, 1977
 マエキシロエダシャク  — Lomographa inamata (Walker, 1861)
 ウスオビシロエダシャク  — Lomographa nivea (Djakonov, 1936)
 クロズウスキエダシャク  — Lomographa simplicior simplicior (Butler, 1881)
 ウスフタスジシロエダシャク  — Lomographa subspersata (Wehrli, 1939)
 バラシロエダシャク  — Lomographa temerata ([Denis & Schiffermüller], 1775)
 ヤマトエダシャク  — Peratostega deletaria hypotaenia (Prout, 1930)
 ウチムラサキヒメエダシャク  — Ninodes splendens (Butler, 1878)
 ワタナベヒメエダシャク  — Ninodes watanabei Inoue, 1976
 クロミスジシロエダシャク  — Myrteta angelica Butler, 1881
 ホシスジシロエダシャク  — Myrteta punctata (Warren, 1894)
 キスジシロエダシャク  — Orthocabera sericea sericea Butler, 1879
 ナミスジシロエダシャク沖縄亜種  — Orthocabera tinagmaria rubripunctata (Wehrli, 1939)
 ナミスジシロエダシャク本土亜種  — Orthocabera tinagmaria tinagmaria (Guenée, 1857)
 ミスジシロエダシャク  — Taeniophila unio (Oberthür, 1880)
 フタオビシロエダシャク  — Lamprocabera candidaria (Leech, 1897)
 ミスジコナフエダシャク  — Cabera exanthemata insulata Inoue, 1958
 アトグロアミメエダシャク  — Cabera griseolimbata griseolimbata (Oberthür, 1879)
 コスジシロエダシャク  — Cabera purus (Butler, 1878)
 ヒラヤマシロエダシャク  — Cabera schaefferi Bremer, 1864
 フタスジウスキエダシャク  — Parabapta aetheriata (Graeser, 1889)
 ウスアオエダシャク  — Parabapta clarissa (Butler, 1878)
 イハラエダシャク  — Parabapta iharai Yazaki, 1989
 フタスジオエダシャク  — Rhynchobapta cervinaria bilineata (Leech, 1891)
 シロミャクオエダシャク  — Rhynchobapta eburnivena (Warren, 1896)
 マエキオエダシャク  — Plesiomorpha flaviceps (Butler, 1881)
 モンオビオエダシャク  — Plesiomorpha punctilinearia (Leech, 1891)
 フタモントガリエダシャク  — Nadagara prosigna Prout, 1930
 ミナミトガリエダシャク  — Nadagara subnubila Inoue, 1967
 マルバエダシャク  — Boninnadagara crinomorpha Inoue, 1994
 ニッコウキエダシャク  — Pseudepione magnaria (Wileman, 1911)
 フタテンソトグロキエダシャク  — Pseudepione shiraii Inoue, 1943
 ウスオビヒメエダシャク  — Euchristophia cumulata cumulata (Christoph, 1881)
 クロハグルマエダシャク  — Synegia esther Butler, 1881
 ハグルマエダシャク本土亜種  — Synegia hadassa hadassa (Butler, 1878)
 ハグルマエダシャク屋久島亜種  — Synegia hadassa yakushimensis Sato, 1990
 マルハグルマエダシャク  — Synegia ichinosawana (Matsumura, 1925)
 スジハグルマエダシャク  — Synegia limitatoides Inoue, 1982
 ミナミハグルマエダシャク  — Synegia masuii Sato, 1990
 オオツカハグルマエダシャク  — Synegia ohtsukai Sato, 1990
 アベリアハグルマエダシャク本土亜種  — Synegia pallens abeliae Sato, 1990
 アベリアハグルマエダシャク屋久島亜種  — Synegia pallens pallens Inoue, 1982
 オオハグルマエダシャク  — Borbacha pardaria (Guenée, 1857)
 シロズエダシャク  — Ecpetelia albifrontaria (Leech, 1891)
 コトビスジエダシャク  — Petelia rivulosa (Butler, 1881)
 オオヨスジアカエダシャク  — Astygisa chlororphnodes (Wehrli, 1936)
 ヨスジアカエダシャク  — Astygisa morosa morosa (Butler, 1881)
 ウラキトガリエダシャク  — Hypephyra terrosa pryeraria (Leech, 1891)
 ツマキエダシャク  — Platycerota incertaria (Leech, 1891)
 ツマキアカエダシャク  — Platycerota particolor (Warren, 1896)
 ナガオエダシャク  — Chiasmia cinerearia (Bremer & Grey, 1853)
 ヒメアミメエダシャク本州以南亜種  — Chiasmia clathrata albifenestra (Inoue, 1942)
 ヒメアミメエダシャク北海道亜種  — Chiasmia clathrata kurilata (Bryk, 1942)
 フタテンオエダシャク  — Chiasmia defixaria (Walker, 1861)
 オキナワオエダシャク  — Chiasmia emersaria emersaria (Walker, 1861)
 ウスオエダシャク  — Chiasmia hebesata (Walker, 1861)
 ギンネムエダシャク  — Macaria abydata Guenée, 1857
 キトビエダシャク  — Macaria brunneata sordida (Butler, 1881)
 シロオビオエダシャク  — Macaria fuscaria (Leech, 1891)
 チャオビオエダシャク  — Macaria liturata pressaria Christoph, 1893
 シャンハイオエダシャク  — Macaria shanghaisaria shanghaisaria Walker, 1861
 シナノオエダシャク  — Macaria signaria (Hübner, [1809])
 ウスキオエダシャク  — Oxymacaria normata proximaria (Leech, 1897)
 フトスジオエダシャク  — Oxymacaria pryeri (Butler, 1879)
 クロモンオエダシャク  — Oxymacaria temeraria (Swinhoe, 1891)
 クロフキエダシャク  — Monocerotesa lutearia (Leech, 1891)
 ツマジロエダシャク  — Krananda latimarginaria Leech, 1891
 スカシエダシャク  — Krananda semihyalina Moore, 1868
 ソトオビエダシャク  — Isturgia arenacearia ([Denis & Schiffermüller], 1775)
 ウスネズミエダシャク  — Isturgia vapulata (Butler, 1879)
 アカエダシャク  — Ectephrina semilutea pruinosaria (Bremer, 1864)
 トビカギバエダシャク  — Luxiaria amasa amasa (Butler, 1878)
 ミナミトビカギバエダシャク  — Luxiaria mitorrhaphes Prout, 1927
 カギバエダシャク  — Pseudonadagara hepatica Inoue, 1994
 キトビカギバエダシャク  — Pseudonadagara semicolor (Warren, 1895)
 アトムスジエダシャク  — Aporhoptrina semiorbiculata (Christoph, 1881)
 ダイセツタカネエダシャク  — Glacies coracina daisetsuzana (Matsumura, 1925)
 ヘリグロエダシャク  — Bupalus vestalis vestalis Staudinger, 1897
 キオビエダシャク  — Milionia zonea pryeri Druce, 1888
 ウメエダシャク  — Cystidia couaggaria couaggaria (Guenée, 1858)
 トンボエダシャク  — Cystidia stratonice stratonice (Stoll, 1782)
 ヒロオビトンボエダシャク  — Cystidia truncangulata Wehrli, 1933
 キベリゴマフエダシャク  — Epobeidia tigrata leopardaria (Oberthür, 1881)
 シロジマエダシャク本土・対馬亜種  — Euryobeidia languidata languidata (Walker, 1862)
 シロジマエダシャク屋久島亜種  — Euryobeidia languidata yakushimensis Inoue, 1976
 ゴマダラシロエダシャク  — Antipercnia albinigrata albinigrata (Warren, 1896)
 オオゴマダラエダシャク  — Parapercnia giraffata (Guenée, 1857)
 クロフオオシロエダシャク  — Pogonopygia nigralbata nigralbata Warren, 1894
 タイワンオオシロエダシャク  — Pogonopygia pavida contaminata (Inoue, 1971)
 クロフシロエダシャク  — Dilophodes elegans elegans (Butler, 1878)
 オオシロエダシャク  — Metabraxas clerica clerica Butler, 1881
 ウスゴマダラエダシャク  — Metabraxas paucimaculata Inoue, 1955
 シロホシエダシャク  — Arichanna albomacularia Leech, 1891
 ヒョウモンエダシャク屋久島亜種  — Arichanna gaschkevitchii deminuta Inoue, 1956
 ヒョウモンエダシャク本土亜種  — Arichanna gaschkevitchii gaschkevitchii (Motschulsky, 1860)
 キシタエダシャク対馬亜種  — Arichanna melanaria askoldinaria (Oberthür, 1880)
 キシタエダシャク本土亜種  — Arichanna melanaria fraterna (Butler, 1878)
 プライヤエダシャク  — Arichanna pryeraria Leech, 1891
 キジマエダシャク  — Arichanna tetrica tetrica (Butler, 1881)
 チャノウンモンエダシャク屋久島以北亜種  — Jankowskia fuscaria fuscaria (Leech, 1891)
 チャノウンモンエダシャク奄美以南亜種  — Jankowskia fuscaria naitoi Sato, 1980
 キタウンモンエダシャク  — Jankowskia pseudathleta Sato, 1980
 クロクモエダシャク  — Apocleora rimosa (Butler, 1878)
 アマミシロテンエダシャク  — Cleora amamiensis Sato, 1978
 キタルリモンエダシャク  — Cleora cinctaria superfumata Inoue, 1972
 リュウキュウフトスジエダシャク  — Cleora injectaria injectaria (Walker, 1860)
 ルリモンエダシャク  — Cleora insolita (Butler, 1878)
 シロテンエダシャク  — Cleora leucophaea (Butler, 1878)
 ヤクシマフトスジエダシャク  — Cleora minutaria (Leech, 1891)
 オガサワラフトスジエダシャク  — Cleora ogasawarensis Inoue, 1994
 フトスジエダシャク  — Cleora repulsaria (Walker, 1860)
 ソトシロモンエダシャク  — Cleora venustaria (Leech, 1891)
 ニセオレクギエダシャク  — Protoboarmia faustinata (Warren, 1897)
 オレクギエダシャク  — Protoboarmia simpliciaria (Leech, 1897)
 マルバトビスジエダシャク  — Anaboarmia aechmeessa (Prout, 1929)
 ナカウスエダシャク  — Alcis angulifera (Butler, 1878)
 イツスジエダシャク  — Alcis extinctaria moesta (Butler, 1881)
 コケエダシャク  — Alcis jubata melanonota Prout, 1930
 ヒメナカウスエダシャク  — Alcis medialbifera Inoue, 1972
 シロシタオビエダシャク  — Alcis picata (Butler, 1881)
 オオナカホシエダシャク  — Alcis pryeraria (Leech, 1897)
 フタヤマエダシャク  — Rikiosatoa grisea grisea (Butler, 1878)
 フタキスジエダシャク  — Gigantalcis flavolinearia (Leech, 1891)
 ババエダシャク  — Hesperumia babai Sato, 1980
 マダラシロエダシャク  — Hesperumia silvicola (Inoue, 1953)
 ネグロエダシャク  — Ramobia basifuscaria (Leech, 1891)
 ナカジロネグロエダシャク  — Ramobia mediodivisa Inoue, 1953
 マツオオエダシャク  — Deileptenia ribeata (Clerck, 1759)
 ウスバシロエダシャク  — Pseuderannis amplipennis (Inoue, 1942)
 ウスバキエダシャク  — Pseuderannis lomozemia (Prout, 1930)
 ツシマウスグロエダシャク  — Polymixinia appositaria (Leech, 1891)
 アキバエダシャク  — Hypomecis akiba (Inoue, 1963)
 フトオビエダシャク  — Hypomecis crassestrigata crassestrigata (Christoph, 1880)
 ナカシロオビエダシャク  — Hypomecis definita (Butler, 1878)
 ヒメミスジエダシャク  — Hypomecis kuriligena (Bryk, 1942)
 オオバナミガタエダシャク  — Hypomecis lunifera (Butler, 1879)
 ウスバミスジエダシャク本土・屋久島亜種  — Hypomecis punctinalis conferenda (Butler, 1878)
 ウスバミスジエダシャク対馬亜種  — Hypomecis punctinalis referendaria (Bryk, 1949)
 ハミスジエダシャク  — Hypomecis roboraria displicens (Butler, 1878)
 アマミミスジエダシャク  — Hypomecis yuwanina (Sato, 1981)
 クロオオモンエダシャク  — Microcalicha fumosaria fumosaria (Leech, 1891)
 シタクモエダシャク  — Microcalicha sordida (Butler, 1878)
 ソトシロオビエダシャク  — Calicha ornataria ornataria (Leech, 1891)
 トビネオオエダシャク  — Phthonosema invenustarium (Leech, 1891)
 リンゴツノエダシャク  — Phthonosema tendinosarium (Bremer, 1864)
 ヨツメエダシャク  — Ophthalmitis albosignaria albosignaria (Bremer & Grey, 1853)
 コヨツメエダシャク  — Ophthalmitis irrorataria (Bremer & Grey, 1853)
 ヨモギエダシャク本州以南亜種  — Ascotis selenaria cretacea (Butler, 1879)
 ヨモギエダシャク北海道亜種  — Ascotis selenaria ijimai Inoue, 1955
 ヒロバウスアオエダシャク  — Paradarisa chloauges kurosawai Inoue, 1956
 シナトビスジエダシャク  — Paradarisa consonaria (Hübner, [1799])
 ナミガタエダシャク  — Heterarmia charon charon (Butler, 1878)
 マエモンキエダシャク  — Heterarmia costipunctaria (Leech, 1891)
 トガリスジグロエダシャク  — Heterarmia dissimilis (Staudinger, 1897)
 セブトエダシャク本州以南亜種  — Cusiala stipitaria kariuzawensis (Bryk, 1949)
 セブトエダシャク北海道亜種  — Cusiala stipitaria stipitaria (Oberthür, 1880)
 ウストビスジエダシャク  — Ectropis aigneri Prout, 1930
 フトフタオビエダシャク  — Ectropis crepuscularia ([Denis & Schiffermüller], 1775)
 オオトビスジエダシャク  — Ectropis excellens (Butler, 1884)
 ウスジロエダシャク  — Ectropis obliqua (Prout, 1915)
 シロモンキエダシャク  — Parectropis similaria japonica Sato, 1980
 シロテントビスジエダシャク  — Abaciscus albipunctatus (Inoue, 1955)
 ウスチャトビモンエダシャク屋久島亜種  — Psilalcis breta postmaculata Inoue, 1956
 ウスチャトビモンエダシャク奄美以南亜種  — Psilalcis breta rantaizana (Wileman, 1911)
 ウスグロナミエダシャク  — Phanerothyris sinearia noctivolans (Butler, 1881)
 ホシミスジエダシャク  — Racotis boarmiaria japonica Inoue, 1953
 ナミスジエダシャク  — Racotis petrosa (Butler, 1879)
 ハンノトビスジエダシャク  — Aethalura ignobilis (Butler, 1878)
 キバネトビスジエダシャク  — Myrioblephara cilicornaria (Püngeler, 1903)
 チビトビスジエダシャク  — Myrioblephara nanaria (Staudinger, 1897)
 ハラゲエダシャク  — Diplurodes vestita fuscovestita Inoue, 1976
 ハラゲチビエダシャク  — Satoblephara parvularia parvularia (Leech, 1891)
 クロスジハイイロエダシャク  — Hirasa paupera (Butler, 1881)
 オオツバメエダシャク  — Amblychia angeronaria Guenée, 1857
 チャマダラエダシャク  — Amblychia insueta (Butler, 1878)
 ヒロオビオオエダシャク  — Xandrames dholaria Moore, 1868
 シロスジオオエダシャク本土亜種  — Xandrames latiferaria latiferaria (Walker, 1860)
 シロスジオオエダシャク屋久島亜種  — Xandrames latiferaria recondita Inoue, 1982
 ヒロオビエダシャク  — Duliophyle agitata agitata (Butler, 1878)
 オオトビエダシャク  — Duliophyle majuscularia (Leech, 1897)
 ツマキウスグロエダシャク  — Scionomia anomala anomala (Butler, 1881)
 ソトキクロエダシャク  — Scionomia mendica mendica (Butler, 1879)
 コツマキウスグロエダシャク  — Scionomia parasinuosa Inoue, 1982
 キマダラツバメエダシャク  — Thinopteryx crocoptera striolata Butler, 1883
 ミヤマツバメエダシャク  — Thinopteryx delectans (Butler, 1878)
 フタマタフユエダシャク  — Larerannis filipjevi Wehrli, 1945
 ヒロバフユエダシャク  — Larerannis miracula (Prout, 1929)
 ナカジマフユエダシャク  — Larerannis nakajimai Inoue, 1986
 ウスオビフユエダシャク  — Larerannis orthogrammaria (Wehrli, 1927)
 トギレエダシャク  — Protalcis concinnata (Wileman, 1911)
 シロフフユエダシャク  — Agriopis dira (Butler, 1879)
 クロスジフユエダシャク  — Pachyerannis obliquaria (Motschulsky, 1861)
 オオチャバネフユエダシャク  — Erannis defoliaria gigantea Inoue, 1955
 チャバネフユエダシャク  — Erannis golda Djakonov, 1929
 チャオビフユエダシャク  — Phigaliohybernia fulvinfula Inoue, 1942
 ウスシモフリトゲエダシャク  — Phigalia djakonovi Moltrecht, 1933
 シモフリトゲエダシャク  — Phigalia sinuosaria Leech, 1897
 シロトゲエダシャク  — Phigalia verecundaria (Leech, 1897)
 ムクゲエダシャク  — Lycia hirtaria parallelaria Inoue, 1958
 フチグロトゲエダシャク  — Nyssiodes lefuarius (Erschoff, 1872)
 クワトゲエダシャク  — Apochima excavata (Dyar, 1905)
 オカモトトゲエダシャク  — Apochima juglansiaria (Graeser, 1889)
 キイロトゲエダシャク  — Apochima praeacutaria (Inoue, 1976)
 カバシタムクゲエダシャク  — Sebastosema bubonarium Warren, 1896
 アシズリエダシャク  — Megabiston ashizuriensis Sato & Kawakami, 2001
 チャエダシャク  — Megabiston plumosaria (Leech, 1891)
 オオシモフリエダシャク  — Biston betularia parvus Leech, 1897
 クロズエダシャク  — Biston marginata Shiraki, 1913
 シロシモフリエダシャク  — Biston melacron Wehrli, 1941
 キオビゴマダラエダシャク  — Biston panterinaria sychnospilas (Prout, 1930)
 ハイイロオオエダシャク  — Biston regalis comitata (Warren, 1899)
 トビモンオオエダシャク屋久島以北亜種  — Biston robustus robustus Butler, 1879
 トビモンオオエダシャク奄美以南亜種  — Biston robustus ryukyuense Inoue, 1964
 チャオビトビモンエダシャク  — Biston strataria hasegawai Inoue, 1955
 タケウチエダシャク  — Biston takeuchii Matsumura, 1931
 フタオレウスグロエダシャク  — Biston thoracicaria (Oberthür, 1884)
 アサヒナオオエダシャク  — Amraica asahinai (Inoue, 1964)
 サキシマオオエダシャク  — Amraica kimurai Sato, 2003
 ウスイロオオエダシャク  — Amraica superans superans (Butler, 1878)
 アミメオオエダシャク  — Mesastrape fulguraria consors (Butler, 1878)
 ウスズミエダシャク  — Lassaba fuliginosa (Inoue & Sato, 1986)
 ニッコウエダシャク  — Lassaba nikkonis (Butler, 1881)
 ニトベエダシャク  — Wilemania nitobei (Nitobe, 1907)
 アトジロエダシャク  — Pachyligia dolosa Butler, 1878
 ハスオビエダシャク  — Descoreba simplex simplex Butler, 1878
 ナンカイキイロエダシャク  — Doratoptera amabilis (Yazaki, 1988)
 キイロエダシャク  — Doratoptera virescens Marumo, 1920
 カバエダシャク  — Colotois pennaria ussuriensis Bang-Haas, 1927
 ヒロバトガリエダシャク  — Planociampa antipala Prout, 1930
 ホソバトガリエダシャク  — Planociampa modesta (Butler, 1878)
 ゴマフキエダシャク  — Angerona nigrisparsa Butler, 1879
 スモモエダシャク  — Angerona prunaria turbata Prout, 1930
 ツマトビキエダシャク  — Bizia aexaria Walker, 1860
 ハガタキエダシャク  — Ctenognophos grandinarius grandinarius (Motschulsky, 1861)
 オイワケキエダシャク  — Exangerona prattiaria (Leech, 1891)
 スジグロエダシャク  — Arbognophos amoenarius (Staudinger, 1897)
 コウノエダシャク  — Elophos vittaria kononis (Matsumura, 1927)
 コケヒメエダシャク  — Dischidesia kurokoi Inoue, 1963
 クワエダシャク  — Phthonandria atrilineata atrilineata (Butler, 1881)
 エゾウスクモエダシャク  — Phthonandria emaria (Bremer, 1864)
 ハルタウスクモエダシャク  — Menophra harutai (Inoue, 1954)
 ウスクモエダシャク  — Menophra senilis (Butler, 1878)
 ヒゲマダラエダシャク  — Cryptochorina amphidasyaria (Oberthür, 1880)
 ハスオビカバエダシャク  — Pseudaspilates obliquizona (Inoue, 1953)
 フタスジギンエダシャク  — Megaspilates mundataria (Stoll, 1782)
 ギンスジエダシャク  — Chariaspilates formosaria (Eversmann, 1837)
 クロモンキリバエダシャク  — Psyra bluethgeni (Püngeler, 1903)
 ミスジキリバエダシャク四国亜種  — Psyra boarmiata masuii Inoue, 1982
 ミスジキリバエダシャク本州亜種  — Psyra boarmiata subcuneata Inoue, 1954
 サラサエダシャク  — Epholca arenosa (Butler, 1878)
 シロモンクロエダシャク  — Proteostrenia leda (Butler, 1878)
 モンキクロエダシャク  — Proteostrenia pica Wileman, 1911
 ハスオビキエダシャク  — Scardamia aurantiacaria Bremer, 1864
 マエキトビエダシャク  — Nothomiza formosa (Butler, 1878)
 オオマエキトビエダシャク  — Nothomiza oxygoniodes Wehrli, 1939
 ヒメキリバエダシャク  — Ennomos infidelis (Prout, 1929)
 キリバエダシャク  — Ennomos nephotropa Prout, 1930
 オオノコメエダシャク  — Acrodontis fumosa (Prout, 1930)
 ヒメノコメエダシャク  — Acrodontis kotshubeji Sheljuzhko, 1944
 タンチャメノコメエダシャク  — Acrodontis tanchame Kobayashi, 1995
 マダラノコメエダシャク  — Acrodontis yazakii Kobayashi, 1995
 エグリヅマエダシャク本土伊豆諸島以外亜種  — Odontopera arida arida (Butler, 1878)
 エグリヅマエダシャク伊豆諸島亜種  — Odontopera arida melancholica (Inoue, 1961)
 キイロエグリヅマエダシャク  — Odontopera aurata (Prout, 1915)
 ウスグロノコバエダシャク  — Odontopera bidentata harutai (Inoue, 1953)
 ウスアカオビエダシャク  — Meteima mediorufa mediorufa (Bastelberger, 1911)
 フタモンキバネエダシャク  — Crocallis elinguaria (Linnaeus, 1758)
 ヨスジキエダシャク  — Cotta incongruaria (Walker, 1860)
 モンシロツマキリエダシャク奄美以南亜種  — Xerodes albonotarius aritai (Inoue, 1971)
 モンシロツマキリエダシャク屋久島以北亜種  — Xerodes albonotarius nesiotis (Wehrli, 1940)
 ミスジツマキリエダシャク  — Xerodes rufescentarius rufescentarius (Motschulsky, [1861])
 コガタツマキリエダシャク  — Xerodes sordidatus (Inoue, 1987)
 キマダラツマキリエダシャク  — Zanclidia testacea (Butler, 1881)
 ミカンコエダシャク  — Hyposidra talaca (Walker, 1860)
 テンモンチビエダシャク  — Ocoelophora lentiginosaria lentiginosaria (Leech, 1891)
 キエダシャク  — Auaxa sulphurea (Butler, 1875)
 キイロミミモンエダシャク  — Eilicrinia parvula Wehrli, 1940
 ミミモンエダシャク  — Eilicrinia wehrlii Djakonov, 1933
 ツマキリウスキエダシャク  — Pareclipsis gracilis (Butler, 1879)
 エグリエダシャク  — Fascellina chromataria Walker, 1860
 ウスムラサキエダシャク  — Selenia adustaria Leech, 1891
 ハガタムラサキエダシャク  — Selenia sordidaria Leech, 1897
 ムラサキエダシャク  — Selenia tetralunaria (Hufnagel, 1769)
 イチモジエダシャク  — Apeira syringaria (Linnaeus, 1758)
 エグリイチモジエダシャク  — Agaraeus discolor (Warren, 1893)
 コガタイチモジエダシャク  — Agaraeus parvus distans (Warren, 1895)
 ナシモンエダシャク対馬亜種  — Garaeus mirandus minimus Inoue, 1982
 ナシモンエダシャク本州・四国・九州亜種  — Garaeus mirandus mirandus (Butler, 1881)
 ナシモンエダシャク北海道亜種  — Garaeus mirandus mirificus Bang-Haas, 1927
 キバラエダシャク  — Garaeus specularis mactans (Butler, 1878)
 ウラモンアカマダラエダシャク  — Entomopteryx combusta (Warren, 1893)
 トガリエダシャク  — Xyloscia subspersata (Felder & Rogenhofer, 1875)
 ツマキリエダシャク  — Endropiodes abjectus abjectus (Butler, 1879)
 ツツジツマキリエダシャク  — Endropiodes circumflexus Inoue, 1976
 モミジツマキリエダシャク  — Endropiodes indictinarius (Bremer, 1864)
 ナカキエダシャク  — Plagodis dolabraria (Linnaeus, 1767)
 コナフキエダシャク本州低地・四国・九州亜種  — Plagodis pulveraria japonica (Butler, 1881)
 コナフキエダシャク北海道亜種  — Plagodis pulveraria jezoensis (Inoue, 1954)
 コナフキエダシャク本州高山帯亜種  — Plagodis pulveraria montana (Inoue, 1954)
 リョクモンエダシャク  — Celenna festivaria manifesta (Inoue, 1964)
 フタマエホシエダシャク  — Achrosis paupera (Butler, 1881)
 フタテンエダシャク  — Seleniopsis evanescens (Butler, 1881)
 ウラベニエダシャク  — Heterolocha aristonaria (Walker, 1860)
 アカネエダシャク  — Heterolocha coccinea Inoue, 1976
 ヒメウラベニエダシャク  — Heterolocha laminaria sutschanska Wehrli, 1937
 ベニスジエダシャク  — Heterolocha stulta (Butler, 1879)
 ウラモンアカエダシャク  — Parepione grata (Butler, 1878)
 アトボシエダシャク  — Cepphis advenaria (Hübner, 1790)
 シダエダシャク  — Petrophora chlorosata (Scopoli, 1763)
 ウラモントガリエダシャク  — Hypoxystis mandli uniformis Inoue, 1955
 アキヨシトガリエダシャク  — Hypoxystis pulcheraria (Herz, 1905)
 ツマトビシロエダシャク  — Spilopera debilis (Butler, 1878)
 ヒメウコンエダシャク  — Corymica arnearia Walker, 1860
 ヘリグロキエダシャク  — Corymica deducta deducta (Walker, 1866)
 ウコンエダシャク  — Corymica pryeri (Butler, 1878)
 フトスジツバメエダシャク  — Ourapteryx japonica Inoue, 1993
 シロツバメエダシャク  — Ourapteryx maculicaudaria (Motschulsky, 1866)
 ウスキツバメエダシャク  — Ourapteryx nivea Butler, 1884
 ノムラツバメエダシャク  — Ourapteryx nomurai Inoue, 1946
 コガタツバメエダシャク  — Ourapteryx obtusicauda (Warren, 1894)
 ヒメツバメエダシャク  — Ourapteryx subpunctaria Leech, 1891
 トラフツバメエダシャク  — Tristrophis veneris (Butler, 1878)
 ホシシャク  — Naxa seriaria (Motschulsky, 1866)
 ハスオビトガリシャク  — Sarcinodes mongaku Marumo, 1920
 ムラサキトガリシャク  — Sarcinodes yaeyamana Inoue, 1976
 クロバネフユシャク  — Alsophila foedata Inoue, [1944]
 ユキムカエフユシャク  — Alsophila inouei Nakajima, 1989
 シロオビフユシャク  — Alsophila japonensis (Warren, 1894)
 サクフウフユシャク  — Alsophila yanagitai Nakajima, 1995
 スジモンフユシャク  — Alsophiloides acroama (Inoue, [1944])
 フタスジフユシャク  — Inurois asahinai Inoue, 1974
 ウスバフユシャク  — Inurois fletcheri Inoue, 1954
 ウスモンフユシャク  — Inurois fumosa (Inoue, [1944])
 シュゼンジフユシャク  — Inurois kobayashii Nakajima, 1992
 クジュウフユシャク  — Inurois kyushuensis Inoue, 1974
 クロテンフユシャク  — Inurois membranaria (Christoph, 1881)
 アカウスバフユシャク  — Inurois minutulus Nakajima & Kudo, 1987
 ヤマウスバフユシャク  — Inurois nikkoensis Nakajima, 1992
 ホソウスバフユシャク  — Inurois tenuis Butler, 1879
 オビベニホシシャク  — Eumelea biflavata insulata Warren, 1896
 メスキベニホシシャク  — Eumelea ludovicata ludovicata Guenée, 1857
 チビウスバホシシャク  — Derambila fragilis (Butler, 1880)
 オキナワトガリシャク  — Ozola defectata Inoue, 1971
 エグリトガリシャク  — Ozola japonica Prout, 1910
 ウスアオアヤシャク  — Pingasa aigneri Prout, 1930
 オオシロアヤシャク  — Pingasa alba brunnescens Prout, 1913
 コアヤシャク  — Pingasa pseudoterpnaria pseudoterpnaria (Guenée, 1857)
 タイワンアヤシャク  — Pingasa ruginaria pacifica Inoue, 1964
 オオアヤシャク  — Pachista superans (Butler, 1878)
 ウスアオシャク  — Dindica virescens (Butler, 1878)
 チズモンアオシャク  — Agathia carissima carissima Butler, 1878
 オガサワラチズモンアオシャク  — Agathia ichnospora Prout, 1934
 ヤエヤマチズモンアオシャク  — Agathia laetata (Fabricius, 1794)
 マダラチズモンアオシャク本土離島以外亜種  — Agathia lycaenaria chizumon Inoue, 1956
 マダラチズモンアオシャク伊豆諸島亜種  — Agathia lycaenaria reducta Inoue, 1961
 マダラチズモンアオシャク琉球亜種  — Agathia lycaenaria samuelsoni Inoue, 1964
 マダラチズモンアオシャク男女諸島亜種  — Agathia lycaenaria subreducta Inoue, 1982
 アシブトチズモンアオシャク伊豆諸島以外亜種  — Agathia visenda curvifiniens Prout, 1917
 アシブトチズモンアオシャク伊豆諸島亜種  — Agathia visenda suzukii Inoue, 1963
 アトヘリアオシャク  — Aracima muscosa muscosa Butler, 1878
 ノコバアオシャク  — Timandromorpha enervata Inoue, 1944
 ヒメカギバアオシャク  — Mixochlora vittata prasina (Butler, 1879)
 カギバアオシャク  — Tanaorhinus reciprocatus confuciarius (Walker, 1861)
 カギシロスジアオシャク  — Geometra dieckmanni Graeser, 1889
 コシロオビアオシャク  — Geometra glaucaria Ménétriès, 1859
 オオシロオビアオシャク  — Geometra papilionaria subrigua (Prout, 1935)
 シロオビアオシャク  — Geometra sponsaria (Bremer, 1864)
 マエモンシロスジアオシャク  — Geometra ussuriensis (Sauber, 1915)
 クロスジアオシャク  — Geometra valida Felder & Rogenhofer, 1875
 キマエアオシャク  — Neohipparchus vallatus (Butler, 1878)
 シロフアオシャク  — Eucyclodes diffictus (Walker, 1861)
 ヒメシロフアオシャク  — Eucyclodes infractus (Wileman, 1911)
 オオサザナミシロアオシャク  — Pelagodes antiquadrarius (Inoue, 1976)
 チビサザナミシロアオシャク  — Pelagodes ogasawarensis Inoue, 1994
 ヒメサザナミアオシャク  — Pelagodes proquadrarius (Inoue, 1976)
 クスアオシャク  — Pelagodes subquadrarius (Inoue, 1976)
 サザナミシロアオシャク  — Thalassodes immissaria intaminata Inoue, 1971
 トガリサザナミシロアオシャク  — Thalassodes supracutipennis Inoue, 1994
 スカシヒメアオシャク  — Jodis amamiensis Inoue, 1982
 ウスミズアオシャク  — Jodis argutaria (Walker, 1866)
 オオナミガタアオシャク  — Jodis dentifascia Warren, 1897
 ナミガタウスキアオシャク  — Jodis lactearia (Linnaeus, 1758)
 コガタヒメアオシャク  — Jodis orientalis Wehrli, 1923
 ヒメナミガタアオシャク  — Jodis placida Inoue, 1986
 マルモンヒメアオシャク  — Jodis praerupta (Butler, 1878)
 ヒメウスアオシャク  — Jodis putata Wehrli, 1923
 ウスキヒメアオシャク  — Jodis urosticta Prout, 1930
 スジモンツバメアオシャク  — Maxates albistrigata (Warren, 1895)
 ツバメアオシャク  — Maxates ambigua (Butler, 1878)
 ズグロツバメアオシャク  — Maxates fuscofrons (Inoue, 1954)
 ハガタツバメアオシャク  — Maxates grandificaria (Graeser, 1890)
 ヒロバツバメアオシャク  — Maxates illiturata (Walker, [1863])
 ヒメツバメアオシャク  — Maxates protrusa (Butler, 1878)
 サキシマツバメアオシャク  — Maxates versicauda microptera (Inoue, 1982)
 コガタアオシャク  — Aoshakuna chlorissoides (Prout, 1912)
 スジツバメアオシャク  — Aoshakuna lucia lucia (Thierry-Mieg, 1917)
 キバラヒメアオシャク  — Hemithea aestivaria (Hübner, [1799])
 ハラアカヒメアオシャク  — Hemithea beethoveni Inoue, 1942
 アオスジアオシャク  — Hemithea marina (Butler, 1878)
 ヘリグロヒメアオシャク  — Hemithea tritonaria (Walker, 1863)
 ハラアカアオシャク  — Chlorissa amphitritaria (Oberthür, 1879)
 ホソバハラアカアオシャク  — Chlorissa anadema (Prout, 1930)
 ウスハラアカアオシャク  — Chlorissa inornata (Matsumura, 1925)
 コウスアオシャク  — Chlorissa obliterata (Walker, 1863)
 オキナワコアオシャク  — Idiochlora minuscula (Inoue, 1986)
 ヒメアオシャク  — Idiochlora takahashii (Inoue, 1982)
 ナミスジコアオシャク  — Idiochlora ussuriaria (Bremer, 1864)
 ヘリアカトガリアオシャク  — Pamphlebia rubrolimbraria rubrolimbraria (Guenée, 1857)
 アカアシアオシャク  — Culpinia diffusa (Walker, 1861)
 ハガタアオシャク  — Thalera rubrifimbria Inoue, 1990
 ウラジロアオシャク  — Spaniocentra hollowayi Inoue, 1986
 ヘリジロヨツメアオシャク  — Comibaena amoenaria (Oberthür, 1880)
 ギンスジアオシャク  — Comibaena argentataria (Leech, 1897)
 クロモンアオシャク  — Comibaena delicatior (Warren, 1897)
 ヨツテンアオシャク  — Comibaena diluta (Warren, 1895)
 カラフトウスアオシャク  — Comibaena ingrata (Wileman, 1911)
 アマミヨツモンアオシャク  — Comibaena insulana Inoue, 1986
 ヨツモンマエジロアオシャク  — Comibaena procumbaria (Pryer, 1877)
 ミナミクロモンアオシャク  — Comibaena subdelicata Inoue, 1986
 ヨツメアオシャク  — Thetidia albocostaria (Bremer, 1864)
 ナミガタフタスジアオシャク  — Thetidia smaragdaria amurensis (Prout, 1935)
 ヘリクロテンアオシャク  — Hemistola dijuncta (Walker, 1861)
 ハガタキスジアオシャク  — Hemistola tenuilinea (Alphéraky, 1897)
 コシロスジアオシャク  — Hemistola veneta (Butler, 1879)
 チビムジアオシャク  — Mujiaoshakua plana (Wileman, 1911)
 アカホシヒメアオシャク  — Comostola rubripunctata (Warren, 1909)
 コヨツメアオシャク伊豆諸島亜種  — Comostola subtiliaria insulata Inoue, 1963
 コヨツメアオシャク琉球亜種  — Comostola subtiliaria kawazoei Inoue, 1963
 コヨツメアオシャク本土・対馬・屋久島亜種  — Comostola subtiliaria nympha (Butler, 1881)
 アカヘリヒメアオシャク  — Eucrostes disparata Walker, 1861
 シロモンウスチャヒメシャク  — Organopoda carnearia (Walker, 1861)
 シロモンアオヒメシャク  — Dithecodes erasa Warren, 1900
 フタナミトビヒメシャク  — Pylargosceles steganioides steganioides (Butler, 1878)
 フトベニスジヒメシャク  — Timandra apicirosea (Prout, 1935)
 コベニスジヒメシャク  — Timandra comptaria Walker, 1863
 トガリベニスジヒメシャク  — Timandra convectaria Walker, 1861
 ウスベニスジヒメシャク  — Timandra dichela (Prout, 1935)
 ベニスジヒメシャク北海道亜種  — Timandra recompta ovidius (Bryk, 1942)
 ベニスジヒメシャク本州以南亜種  — Timandra recompta prouti (Inoue, 1958)
 サキシマベニスジヒメシャク  — Timandra sakishimensis (Inoue, 1971)
 マエアカヒメシャク  — Traminda aventiaria (Guenée, 1857)
 ヨツメヒメシャク  — Cyclophora albipunctata griseolata (Staudinger, 1897)
 ビンガタヒメシャク  — Chrysocraspeda faganaria (Guenée, 1857)
 モモイロヒメシャク  — Chrysocraspeda sanguinea Warren, 1896
 クロモンウスチャヒメシャク  — Perixera absconditaria absconditaria (Walker, [1863])
 コブウスチャヒメシャク  — Perixera illepidaria (Guenée, 1857)
 コガタウスチャヒメシャク  — Perixera minorata dubiosa (Prout, 1938)
 クスイウスチャヒメシャク  — Perixera niveopuncta (Warren, 1897)
 オキナワウスチャヒメシャク  — Perixera obliviaria (Walker, 1861)
 クロテンウスチャヒメシャク  — Perixera obrinaria obrinaria (Guenée, 1857)
 ウンモンオオシロヒメシャク  — Somatina indicataria morata Prout, 1938
 フタツメオオシロヒメシャク  — Problepsis albidior matsumurai Prout, 1938
 クロスジオオシロヒメシャク  — Problepsis diazoma Prout, 1938
 ツシマオオシロヒメシャク  — Problepsis eucircota Prout, 1913
 ウススジオオシロヒメシャク  — Problepsis plagiata (Butler, 1881)
 ヒトツメオオシロヒメシャク  — Problepsis superans superans (Butler, 1885)
 ミドリヒメシャク  — Antitrygodes divisarius perturbatus Prout, 1914
 クシヒゲハイイロヒメシャク  — Antilycauges pinguis (Swinhoe, 1902)
 オキナワトガリヒメシャク  — Scopula anisopleura Inoue, 1982
 クロテンシロヒメシャク  — Scopula apicipunctata (Christoph, 1881)
 キスジシロヒメシャク  — Scopula asthena Inoue, 1943
 ウスアカヒメシャク  — Scopula caesaria (Walker, 1861)
 ミスジハイイロヒメシャク  — Scopula cineraria (Leech, 1897)
 ウスキトガリヒメシャク  — Scopula confusa (Butler, 1878)
 シモフリシロヒメシャク  — Scopula coniaria (Prout, 1913)
 ウラナミヒメシャク  — Scopula corrivalaria eccletica Prout, 1935
 マルバヒメシャク  — Scopula duplinupta Inoue, 1982
 キトガリヒメシャク  — Scopula emissaria lactea (Butler, 1879)
 ミナミヒメシャク  — Scopula emma jordani (West, 1930)
 ギンバネヒメシャク  — Scopula epiorrhoe Prout, 1935
 イリオモテトガリヒメシャク  — Scopula eulomata (Snellen, 1877)
 ヤスジマルバヒメシャク  — Scopula floslactata claudata (Prout, 1913)
 クリームヒメシャク  — Scopula gilva Sato, 1993
 サカハチヒメシャク  — Scopula hanna (Butler, 1878)
 ミナミハイイロヒメシャク  — Scopula hypochra (Meyrick, 1888)
 ハスジトガリヒメシャク本州以南亜種  — Scopula ichinosawana honshuensis Inoue, 1982
 ハスジトガリヒメシャク北海道亜種  — Scopula ichinosawana ichinosawana (Matsumura, 1925)
 ウスキクロテンヒメシャク  — Scopula ignobilis (Warren, 1901)
 ハイイロヒメシャク  — Scopula impersonata macescens (Butler, 1879)
 サツマヒメシャク  — Scopula insolata satsumaria (Leech, 1897)
 チビシロヒメシャク  — Scopula kawabei Inoue, 1982
 ウラモンクロスジヒメシャク  — Scopula limbata (Wileman, 1915)
 ウスウラナミヒメシャク  — Scopula longicerata Inoue, 1955
 ヘリグロヒメシャク  — Scopula luridata sternecki Prout, 1935
 ミチノクヒメシャク  — Scopula michinoku Sato, 1994
 モントビヒメシャク  — Scopula modicaria (Leech, 1897)
 オキナワクロテンヒメシャク  — Scopula nesciaria absconditaria (Walker, 1861)
 マエキヒメシャク本州以南亜種  — Scopula nigropunctata imbella (Warren, 1901)
 マエキヒメシャク北海道亜種  — Scopula nigropunctata subimbella Inoue, 1958
 シロヒメシャク  — Scopula nivearia (Leech, 1897)
 サザナミシロヒメシャク  — Scopula nupta (Butler, 1878)
 フチグロシロヒメシャク  — Scopula ornata subornata (Prout, 1913)
 ナミスジチビヒメシャク  — Scopula personata (Prout, 1913)
 ナガサキヒメシャク  — Scopula plumbearia (Leech, 1881)
 オオクロテンヒメシャク  — Scopula praesignipuncta Prout, 1920
 ウラクロスジシロヒメシャク  — Scopula prouti Djakonov, 1935
 クロスジシロヒメシャク  — Scopula pudicaria (Motschulsky, 1861)
 タイワントガリヒメシャク  — Scopula pulchellata takowensis Prout, 1938
 ミナミウスキヒメシャク  — Scopula remotata (Guenée, 1857)
 ウスサカハチヒメシャク  — Scopula semignobilis Inoue, 1942
 ウラテンシロヒメシャク  — Scopula subpunctaria (Herrich-Schäffer, 1847)
 ヨツボシウスキヒメシャク  — Scopula superciliata (Prout, 1913)
 キナミシロヒメシャク  — Scopula superior (Butler, 1878)
 シベチャシロヒメシャク  — Scopula supernivearia Inoue, 1963
 タカオシロヒメシャク  — Scopula takao Inoue, 1954
 アメイロヒメシャク  — Scopula tenuisocius Inoue, 1942
 スミレシロヒメシャク北海道亜種  — Scopula umbelaria graeseri Prout, 1935
 スミレシロヒメシャク本州以南亜種  — Scopula umbelaria majoraria (Leech, 1897)
 コヒメシャク  — Scopula virgulata albicans (Prout, 1913)
 ヨスジキヒメシャク  — Idaea auricruda (Butler, 1879)
 エゾキヒメシャク  — Idaea aversata japonica (Inoue, 1955)
 ウスキヒメシャク  — Idaea biselata (Hufnagel, 1767)
 サキシマキヒメシャク  — Idaea contravalida Inoue, 1982
 クロモンチビヒメシャク  — Idaea crassipuncta (Inoue, 1971)
 ウスモンキヒメシャク  — Idaea denudaria (Prout, 1913)
 モンウスキヒメシャク  — Idaea effusaria (Christoph, 1881)
 クロテントビヒメシャク  — Idaea foedata (Butler, 1879)
 オオウスモンキヒメシャク  — Idaea imbecilla (Inoue, 1955)
 キオビベニヒメシャク  — Idaea impexa impexa (Butler, 1879)
 オイワケヒメシャク伊豆諸島亜種  — Idaea invalida faceta (Inoue, 1943)
 オイワケヒメシャク伊豆諸島以外亜種  — Idaea invalida invalida (Butler, 1879)
 フチベニヒメシャク  — Idaea jakima (Butler, 1878)
 キュウシュウヒメシャク  — Idaea kyushuensis Sato, 1994
 ベニヒメシャク  — Idaea muricata minor (Sterneck, 1927)
 チビキヒメシャク  — Idaea neovalida (Inoue, 1958)
 オビベニヒメシャク  — Idaea nielseni (Hedemann, 1879)
 ウスキヒカリヒメシャク  — Idaea nitidata (Herrich-Schäffer, 1861)
 キヒメシャク  — Idaea nudaria infuscaria (Leech, 1897)
 マエベニヒメシャク  — Idaea obliteraria (Leech, 1879)
 コフチベニヒメシャク  — Idaea okinawensis Inoue, 1982
 ツシマキヒメシャク  — Idaea paravalida Sato, 1988
 ウスジロヒカリヒメシャク  — Idaea promiscuaria (Leech, 1879)
 ホソスジキヒメシャク  — Idaea remissa (Wileman, 1911)
 シタベニヒメシャク  — Idaea roseomarginaria (Inoue, 1958)
 サクライキヒメシャク  — Idaea sakuraii (Inoue, 1963)
 ウスクロテンヒメシャク  — Idaea salutaria (Christoph, 1881)
 タナカヒメシャク  — Idaea tanakai Sato, 1994
 クロオビキヒメシャク  — Idaea terpnaria (Prout, 1913)
 ミジンキヒメシャク  — Idaea trisetata (Prout, 1922)
 ツマアカナミシャク北海道亜種  — Aplocera perelegans kurilata (Bryk, 1942)
 ツマアカナミシャク本州以南亜種  — Aplocera perelegans perelegans (Warren, 1894)
 テンオビナミシャク  — Acasis appensata (Eversmann, 1842)
 アヤコバネナミシャク  — Acasis bellaria (Leech, 1891)
 ルリオビナミシャク  — Acasis viretata viretata (Hübner, [1799])
 シロオビコバネナミシャク  — Neopachrophilla albida Inoue, 1955
 ホソクロオビシロナミシャク  — Trichopteryx auricilla Inoue, 1955
 シロシタコバネナミシャク  — Trichopteryx fastuosa Inoue, 1958
 シロテンコバネナミシャク  — Trichopteryx grisearia (Leech, 1891)
 シタコバネナミシャク  — Trichopteryx hemana (Butler, 1878)
 ハイイロコバネナミシャク  — Trichopteryx ignorata Inoue, 1958
 ウスオビコバネナミシャク  — Trichopteryx incerta Yazaki, 1978
 ヒメシタコバネナミシャク  — Trichopteryx microloba Inoue, 1943
 ウスミドリコバネナミシャク  — Trichopteryx miracula Inoue, 1942
 クロシタコバネナミシャク  — Trichopteryx misera (Butler, 1879)
 オビコバネナミシャク  — Trichopteryx muscigera (Butler, 1881)
 チャマダラコバネナミシャク  — Trichopteryx nagaii Inoue, 1958
 ハネナガコバネナミシャク  — Trichopteryx polycommata anna Inoue, 1955
 チャオビコバネナミシャク  — Trichopteryx terranea (Butler, 1878)
 マダラコバネナミシャク  — Trichopteryx ussurica (Wehrli, 1927)
 クロオビシロナミシャク  — Trichopteryx ustata (Christoph, 1881)
 ウスベニスジナミシャク  — Esakiopteryx volitans (Butler, 1878)
 ウスアカモンナミシャク  — Trichopterigia consobrinaria (Leech, 1891)
 アカモンナミシャク  — Trichopterigia costipunctaria Leech, 1897
 シロシタヒメナミシャク  — Lobophora halterata ijimai Inoue, 1955
 アトスジグロナミシャク  — Epilobophora obscuraria (Leech, 1891)
 クロフシロナミシャク  — Otoplecta frigida (Butler, 1878)
 ゴマダラシロナミシャク  — Naxidia maculata (Butler, 1879)
 ヒメゴマダラシロナミシャク  — Naxidia semiobscura Inoue, 1955
 ホシスジトガリナミシャク  — Carige cruciplaga cruciplaga (Walker, 1861)
 ヒロバトガリナミシャク  — Carige irrorata (Butler, 1879)
 ウスキクロスジナミシャク  — Carige obsoleta (Inoue, 1971)
 ホソバトガリナミシャク  — Carige scutilimbata Prout, 1936
 モンクロキイロナミシャク  — Stamnodes danilovi sugitanii Prout, 1937
 シロオビクロナミシャク本州以南亜種  — Trichobaptria exsecuta exsecuta (Felder & Rogenhofer, 1875)
 シロオビクロナミシャク北海道亜種  — Trichobaptria exsecuta latifasciaria (Leech, 1897)
 シラフシロオビナミシャク北海道亜種  — Trichodezia kindermanni latifasciaria Matsumura, 1925
 シラフシロオビナミシャク本州以南亜種  — Trichodezia kindermanni leechi Inoue, 1946
 シロホソオビクロナミシャク本州以南亜種  — Baptria tibiale aterrima (Butler, 1877)
 シロホソオビクロナミシャク北海道亜種  — Baptria tibiale hiroobi Inoue, 1954
 コウスグモナミシャク  — Heterophleps confusa confusa (Wileman, 1911)
 サキシマウスクモナミシャク  — Heterophleps endoi Inoue, 1982
 ウスクモナミシャク奄美亜種  — Heterophleps fusca amamiensis Inoue, 1964
 ウスクモナミシャク本土亜種  — Heterophleps fusca fusca (Butler, 1878)
 ミツボシナミシャク  — Heterophleps pallescens (Warren, 1896)
 アオナミシャク  — Leptostegna tenerata Christoph, 1881
 ホソバナミシャク奄美亜種  — Tyloptera bella amamiensis Sato, 1986
 ホソバナミシャク本土亜種  — Tyloptera bella bella (Butler, 1878)
 シラユキナミシャク  — Palaeomystis mabillaria (Poujade, 1895)
 キリバネホソナミシャク  — Brabira artemidora artemidora (Oberthür, 1884)
 チャホシホソバナミシャク  — Brabira kasaii Sato, 1986
 テングホソナミシャク  — Sauris angustifasciata (Inoue, 1976)
 ナンカイヒゲブトナミシャク  — Sauris hirudinata Guenée, 1857
 ミナミヒゲブトナミシャク  — Sauris interruptata (Moore, 1888)
 コバネヒゲブトナミシャク  — Sauris marginepunctata (Warren, 1899)
 ヒゲブトナミシャク  — Sauris nanaria Leech, 1897
 マダラヒゲブトナミシャク  — Episteira eupena (Prout, 1936)
 ウスミドリナミシャク  — Episteira nigrilinearia nigrilinearia (Leech, 1897)
 ミドリホソナミシャク  — Phthonoloba viridifasciata (Inoue, 1963)
 ハガタチビナミシャク  — Hastina subfalcaria subfalcaria (Christoph, 1881)
 フタオモドキナミシャク  — Macrohastina azela azela (Butler, 1878)
 キアシシロナミシャク本州以南亜種  — Xanthorhoe abraxina abraxina (Butler, 1879)
 キアシシロナミシャク北海道亜種  — Xanthorhoe abraxina pudicata (Christoph, 1881)
 ナカシロスジナミシャク  — Xanthorhoe biriviata angularia (Leech, 1897)
 アカマダラシマナミシャク  — Xanthorhoe dentipostmediana Inoue, 1954
 トビスジコナミシャク  — Xanthorhoe designata rectantemediana (Wehrli, 1927)
 クロモンミヤマナミシャク  — Xanthorhoe fluctuata malleola Inoue, 1955
 フタトビスジナミシャク  — Xanthorhoe hortensiaria (Graeser, 1889)
 ツマグロナミシャク  — Xanthorhoe muscicapata (Christoph, 1881)
 ナカクロオビナミシャク  — Xanthorhoe purpureofascia Inoue, 1982
 ヨスジナミシャク  — Xanthorhoe quadrifasciata ignobilis (Butler, 1881)
 タカネナミシャク  — Xanthorhoe sajanaria (Prout, 1914)
 フトジマナミシャク  — Xanthorhoe saturata (Guenée, 1857)
 ハングロナミシャク  — Xanthorhoe semilactescens Inoue, 1982
 キタミナミシャク  — Xanthorhoe separata Inoue, 2004
 トビスジヒメナミシャク  — Orthonama obstipata (Fabricius, 1794)
 ウスイロトビスジナミシャク  — Costaconvexa caespitaria (Christoph, 1881)
 シラナミナミシャク  — Glaucorhoe unduliferaria unduliferaria (Motschulsky, 1861)
 ハコベナミシャク  — Euphyia cineraria (Butler, 1878)
 フタテンツマジロナミシャク  — Euphyia unangulata gracilaria (Bang-Haas, 1906)
 フタモンクロナミシャク  — Catarhoe obscura obscura (Butler, 1878)
 ムツテンナミシャク  — Catarhoe yokohamae (Butler, 1881)
 ハチノジクロナミシャク  — Pseudobaptria corydalaria japonica (Hori, 1929)
 ニッコウナミシャク  — Amoebotricha grataria (Leech, 1891)
 ミカヅキナミシャク  — Earophila correlata (Warren, 1901)
 ウラウスキナミシャク  — Protonebula umbrifera (Butler, 1879)
 タテスジナミシャク  — Pareulype consanguinea (Butler, 1878)
 チャイロナミシャク  — Pelurga comitata (Linnaeus, 1758)
 ネスジナミシャク  — Pelurga onoi (Inoue, 1965)
 クロアシナミシャク  — Pelurga taczanowskiaria (Oberthür, 1880)
 キンオビナミシャク  — Electrophaes corylata granitalis (Butler, 1881)
 ヒメキンオビナミシャク  — Electrophaes recens Inoue, 1982
 イチゴナミシャク  — Mesoleuca albicillata casta (Butler, 1878)
 チャオビマエモンナミシャク  — Mesoleuca mandshuricata (Bremer, 1864)
 ヒトスジシロナミシャク本州以南亜種  — Epirrhoe hastulata echigoensis Inoue, 1982
 ヒトスジシロナミシャク北海道亜種  — Epirrhoe hastulata reducta (Djakonov, 1929)
 フタシロスジナミシャク  — Epirrhoe supergressa supergressa (Butler, 1878)
 シロテンサザナミナミシャク  — Entephria amplicosta Inoue, 1955
 サザナミナミシャク  — Entephria caesiata nebulosa Inoue, 1955
 モンキキナミシャク  — Idiotephria amelia (Butler, 1878)
 ギフウスキナミシャク  — Idiotephria debilitata (Leech, 1891)
 ナカモンキナミシャク  — Idiotephria evanescens (Staudinger, 1897)
 ヤナギナミシャク  — Hydriomena furcata nexifasciata (Butler, 1881)
 ヒロオビナミシャク  — Hydriomena impluviata insulata Inoue, 1953
 ウスグロオオナミシャク  — Triphosa dubitata amblychiles Prout, 1837
 マエモンオオナミシャク  — Triphosa sericata sericata (Butler, 1879)
 クモオビナミシャク  — Triphosa umbraria (Leech, 1891)
 クロヤエナミシャク  — Triphosa vashti vashti (Butler, 1878)
 シロモンオオナミシャク  — Rheumaptera albiplaga latiplaga (Inoue, 1976)
 シロヤエナミシャク  — Rheumaptera flavipes flavipes (Ménétriès, 1858)
 オオシロオビクロナミシャク  — Rheumaptera hastata rikovskensis (Matsumura, 1925)
 サカハチクロナミシャク本州以南亜種  — Rheumaptera hecate hecate (Butler, 1878)
 サカハチクロナミシャク北海道亜種  — Rheumaptera hecate matsumurai Inoue, 1977
 ウスベニナミシャク  — Rheumaptera hedemannaria (Oberthür, 1880)
 ツマグロヤエナミシャク  — Rheumaptera inanata (Christoph, 1881)
 オイワケヤエナミシャク  — Rheumaptera latifasciaria (Leech, 1891)
 キボシヤエナミシャク  — Rheumaptera neocervinalis Inoue, 1982
 ヤエナミシャク  — Rheumaptera undulata (Linnaeus, 1758)
 エゾヤエナミシャク  — Philereme corrugata (Butler, 1884)
 トビスジヤエナミシャク  — Philereme transversata japanaria (Leech, 1891)
 ネグロウスベニナミシャク  — Photoscotosia atrostrigata (Bremer, 1864)
 オオネグロウスベニナミシャク  — Photoscotosia lucicolens (Butler, 1878)
 テンヅマナミシャク  — Telenomeuta punctimarginaria punctimarginaria (Leech, 1891)
 キガシラオオナミシャク本州以南亜種  — Gandaritis agnes agnes (Butler, 1878)
 キガシラオオナミシャク北海道亜種  — Gandaritis agnes festinaria (Christoph, 1881)
 マルモンシロナミシャク  — Gandaritis evanescens (Butler, 1881)
 キマダラオオナミシャク  — Gandaritis fixseni (Bremer, 1864)
 オオナミシャク  — Gandaritis maculata Swinhoe, 1894
 キベリシロナミシャク  — Gandaritis placida (Butler, 1878)
 ツマキシロナミシャク本州以南亜種  — Gandaritis whitelyi leechi (Inoue, 1955)
 ツマキシロナミシャク北海道亜種  — Gandaritis whitelyi whitelyi (Butler, 1878)
 ナミガタシロナミシャク  — Callabraxas compositata compositata (Guenée, 1857)
 ヨコジマナミシャク  — Eulithis convergenata (Bremer, 1864)
 ウストビモンナミシャク  — Eulithis ledereri (Bremer, 1864)
 チョウセンハガタナミシャク  — Eulithis prunata leucoptera (Djakonov, 1929)
 キジマソトグロナミシャク北海道亜種  — Eulithis pyropata elegans (Inoue, 1955)
 キジマソトグロナミシャク本州以南亜種  — Eulithis pyropata pyropata (Hübner, [1809])
 キマダラナミシャク  — Eulithis testata (Linnaeus, 1761)
 ナワメナミシャク  — Lampropteryx jameza jameza (Butler, 1878)
 アトクロナミシャク  — Lampropteryx minna (Butler, 1881)
 チビアトクロナミシャク  — Lampropteryx otregiata Metcalfe, 1917
 ヒダカアトクロナミシャク  — Lampropteryx suffumata ([Denis & Schiffermüller], 1775)
 ナカクロモンシロナミシャク  — Cosmorhoe ocellata (Linnaeus, 1758)
 セスジナミシャク  — Evecliptopera illitata illitata (Wileman, 1911)
 セキナミシャク  — Ecliptopera capitata mariesii (Butler, 1881)
 ソトキナミシャク  — Ecliptopera pryeri (Butler, 1881)
 ヒメハガタナミシャク  — Ecliptopera silaceata leuca (Djakonov, 1929)
 オオハガタナミシャク  — Ecliptopera umbrosaria umbrosaria (Motschulsky, 1861)
 ミヤマアミメナミシャク  — Eustroma aerosum (Butler, 1878)
 キアミメナミシャク  — Eustroma japonicum Inoue, 1986
 ハガタナミシャク  — Eustroma melancholicum melancholicum (Butler, 1878)
 アミメナミシャク  — Eustroma reticulatum obsoletum Djakonov, 1929
 ホソスジナミシャク  — Lobogonodes complicata complicata (Butler, 1879)
 キホソスジナミシャク  — Lobogonodes erectaria (Leech, 1897)
 シロホソスジナミシャク  — Lobogonodes multistriata (Moore, 1889)
 キスジビロードナミシャク  — Sibatania arizana fluctigera Hiramatsu, 1978
 ビロードナミシャク  — Sibatania mactata (Felder & Rogenhofer, 1875)
 トビモンシロナミシャク  — Plemyria rubiginata japonica Inoue, 1955
 シロマダラナミシャク  — Dysstroma albicoma (Inoue, 1954)
 フタテンナカジロナミシャク  — Dysstroma cinereatum japonicum Heydemann, 1929
 ツマキナカジロナミシャク  — Dysstroma citratum nyiwonis (Matsumura, 1925)
 ウスキナカジロナミシャク本州以南亜種  — Dysstroma infuscatum euglaucum Inoue, 1976
 ウスキナカジロナミシャク北海道亜種  — Dysstroma infuscatum subglaucum Inoue, 1955
 マエキナカジロナミシャク  — Dysstroma korbi Heydemann, 1929
 アルプスナカジロナミシャク  — Dysstroma pseudimmanatum splendidum Inoue, 1976
 ウチジロナミシャク  — Dysstroma truncatum fusconebulosm Inoue, 1976
 ネアカナカジロナミシャク  — Paradysstroma corussarium (Oberthür, 1880)
 キオビハガタナミシャク  — Thera variata bellisi Viidalepp, 1977
 ミヤマクロオビナミシャク  — Praethera anomala (Inoue, 1954)
 オオクロオビナミシャク  — Praethera praefecta (Prout, 1914)
 ウスクロオビナミシャク  — Pennithera abolla (Inoue, 1943)
 クロオビナミシャク  — Pennithera comis (Butler, 1879)
 シロシタトビイロナミシャク  — Heterothera postalbida (Wileman, 1911)
 モトクロオビナミシャク  — Heterothera quadrifulta (Prout, 1928)
 マダラクロオビナミシャク  — Heterothera serrataria (Prout, 1914)
 ソウウンクロオビナミシャク  — Heterothera taigana sounkeana (Matsumura, 1927)
 フタクロテンナミシャク本州以南亜種  — Xenortholitha propinguata niphonica (Butler, 1878)
 フタクロテンナミシャク北海道亜種  — Xenortholitha propinguata suavata (Christoph, 1881)
 コナミフユナミシャク  — Operophtera brunnea Nakajima, 1991
 ヒメクロオビフユナミシャク  — Operophtera crispifascia Inoue, 1982
 サザナミフユナミシャク  — Operophtera japonaria (Leech, 1891)
 ミヤマフユナミシャク  — Operophtera nana Inoue, 1955
 イチモジフユナミシャク  — Operophtera rectipostmediana Inoue, 1942
 クロオビフユナミシャク  — Operophtera relegata Prout, 1908
 オオナミフユナミシャク  — Operophtera variabilis Nakajima, 1991
 アキナミシャク  — Epirrita autumnata autumna (Bryk, 1942)
 ミドリアキナミシャク  — Epirrita viridipurpurescens (Prout, 1937)
 ナカオビアキナミシャク  — Nothoporinia mediolineata (Prout, 1914)
 シロオビマルバナミシャク  — Solitanea defricata (Püngeler, 1903)
 トビスジトガリナミシャク  — Zola terranea terranea (Butler, 1879)
 キモンハイイロナミシャク  — Venusia blomeri (Curtis, 1832)
 ミヤマナミシャク  — Venusia cambrica Curtis, 1839
 クロスジカバイロナミシャク  — Venusia laria ilara (Prout, 1938)
 フタモンコナミシャク  — Venusia megaspilata (Warren, 1895)
 ナナスジナミシャク  — Venusia phasma (Butler, 1879)
 マエモンハイイロナミシャク本州以南亜種  — Venusia semistrigata expressa Inoue, 1963
 マエモンハイイロナミシャク北海道亜種  — Venusia semistrigata semistrigata (Christoph, 1881)
 カバイロヒメナミシャク  — Hydrelia adesma Prout, 1930
 マダラウスナミシャク  — Hydrelia bicauliata Prout, 1914
 キヒメナミシャク  — Hydrelia flammeolaria (Hufnagel, 1767)
 ホソスジハイイロナミシャク  — Hydrelia gracilipennis Inoue, 1982
 テンスジヒメナミシャク  — Hydrelia nisaria (Christoph, 1881)
 チビヒメナミシャク  — Hydrelia shioyana (Matsumura, 1927)
 キスジハイイロナミシャク  — Hydrelia sylvata ([Denis & Schiffermüller], 1775)
 ハンノナミシャク  — Euchoeca nebulata (Scopoli, 1763)
 ヘリスジナミシャク  — Eschatarchia lineata lineata Warren, 1894
 ウステンシロナミシャク  — Asthena amurensis (Staudinger, 1897)
 キムジシロナミシャク  — Asthena corculina Butler, 1878
 マンサクシロナミシャク  — Asthena hamadryas Inoue, 1976
 ムスジシロナミシャク  — Asthena nymphaeata (Staudinger, 1897)
 フタマタシロナミシャク  — Asthena ochrifasciaria Leech, 1897
 キマダラシロナミシャク  — Asthena octomacularia Leech, 1897
 カラフトシロナミシャク  — Asthena sachalinensis (Matsumura, 1925)
 スカシシロナミシャク  — Asthena undulata (Wileman, 1915)
 キイロナミシャク  — Pseudostegania defectata (Christoph, 1881)
 セジロナミシャク  — Laciniodes denigratus ussuriensis Prout, 1939
 セグロナミシャク  — Laciniodes unistirpis (Butler, 1878)
 キベリヒメナミシャク  — Eois grataria (Walker, 1861)
 マエチャナミシャク  — Acolutha pictaria shirozui Inoue, 1955
 ハガタマエチャナミシャク  — Acolutha pulchella semifulva Warren, 1905
 アカモンコナミシャク  — Palpoctenidia phoenicosoma semilauta Prout, 1939
 ハネナガナミシャク  — Physetobasis dentifascia triangulifera Inoue, 1954
 ハマダラナミシャク  — Pomasia denticlathrata Warren, 1893
 コカバスジナミシャク  — Martania fulvida (Butler, 1881)
 キオビカバスジナミシャク  — Martania minimata (Staudinger, 1897)
 ヒメカバスジナミシャク  — Martania saxea (Wileman, 1911)
 ウスカバスジナミシャク  — Martania taeniata (Stephens, 1831)
 クロカバスジナミシャク  — Gagitodes parvaria parvaria (Leech, 1891)
 ヤハズナミシャク  — Gagitodes sagittata albiflua (Prout, 1939)
 ウスモンチビナミシャク  — Perizoma contritum (Prout, 1913)
 フタオビカバナミシャク  — Perizoma haasi (Hedemann, 1881)
 ミヤマチビナミシャク  — Perizoma japonicum Inoue, 1955
 オオクロテンカバナミシャク  — Eupithecia abietaria debrunneata Staudinger, 1897
 ホソチビナミシャク  — Eupithecia absinthiata (Clerck, 1759)
 ウラモンカバナミシャク  — Eupithecia actaeata praenubilata Inoue, 1958
 ミジンカバナミシャク  — Eupithecia addictata Dietze, 1908
 ウストビナミシャク  — Eupithecia amplexata pryeriaria Leech, 1897
 オオウストビナミシャク  — Eupithecia antaggregata Inoue, 1977
 ヒコサンカバナミシャク  — Eupithecia antivulgaria Inoue, 1965
 ヒメカバナミシャク  — Eupithecia aritai Inoue, 1977
 カラスナミシャク  — Eupithecia caliginea Butler, 1878
 モンウスカバナミシャク  — Eupithecia clavifera Inoue, 1955
 クロモンカバナミシャク  — Eupithecia consortaria Leech, 1897
 シタジロカバナミシャク  — Eupithecia conterminata idiopusillata Inoue, 1979
 和名未定  — Eupithecia costalis Walker, 1869
 マエテンカバナミシャク  — Eupithecia costiconvexa Inoue, 1979
 ヨホシナミシャク  — Eupithecia costimacularia Leech, 1897
 ナカグロチビナミシャク  — Eupithecia daemionata Dietze, 1903
 カメダカバナミシャク  — Eupithecia detritata Staudinger, 1897
 クロテンカバナミシャク  — Eupithecia emanata Dietze, 1908
 シロマダラカバナミシャク  — Eupithecia extensaria leuca Dietze, 1913
 キモンカバナミシャク  — Eupithecia flavoapicaria Inoue, 1979
 フジカバナミシャク  — Eupithecia fujisana Inoue, 1980
 フトオビヒメナミシャク  — Eupithecia gigantea Staudinger, 1897
 グンマカバナミシャク  — Eupithecia gummaensis Inoue, 1980
 ウススジヒメカバナミシャク  — Eupithecia homogrammata Dietze, 1908
 ミヤマカバナミシャク  — Eupithecia impavida Vojnits, 1979
 アミモンカバナミシャク  — Eupithecia insigniata insignioides Wehrli, 1923
 クロテンヤスジカバナミシャク  — Eupithecia interpunctaria Inoue, 1979
 エゾチビナミシャク  — Eupithecia jezonica Matsumura, 1927
 ジンボカバナミシャク  — Eupithecia jinboi Inoue, 1976
 チャバネカバナミシャク  — Eupithecia kobayashii Inoue, 1958
 ウスイロヤスジカバナミシャク  — Eupithecia kurilensis Bryk, 1942
 クロシオカバナミシャク  — Eupithecia kuroshio Inoue, 1980
 ホソカバスジナミシャク  — Eupithecia lariciata (Freyer, 1842)
 ムネシロテンカバナミシャク  — Eupithecia maenamiella Inoue, 1980
 ヤスジカバナミシャク  — Eupithecia mandschurica japonica Inoue, 1979
 マスイカバナミシャク  — Eupithecia masuii Inoue, 1980
 フタシロスジカバナミシャク  — Eupithecia melanolopha Swinhoe, 1895
 ナガイカバナミシャク  — Eupithecia nagaii Inoue, 1963
 ミスジカバナミシャク  — Eupithecia neosatyrata Inoue, 1979
 マエナミカバナミシャク  — Eupithecia niphonaria Leech, 1897
 オオモンカバナミシャク  — Eupithecia okadai Inoue, 1958
 ウスカバナミシャク  — Eupithecia proterva Butler, 1878
 チャイロカバナミシャク  — Eupithecia pseudassimilata Viidalepp & Mironov, 1988
 クロマダラカバナミシャク  — Eupithecia pygmaeata (Hübner, [1799])
 セアカカバナミシャク  — Eupithecia quadripunctata Warren, 1888
 フタモンカバナミシャク  — Eupithecia repentina Vojnits & Laever, 1978
 ムラサキカバナミシャク  — Eupithecia rigida Swinhoe, 1892
 ウスアカチビナミシャク  — Eupithecia rufescens Butler, 1878
 クニガミカバナミシャク  — Eupithecia ryukyuensis Inoue, 1971
 ウラモンウストビナミシャク  — Eupithecia scribai Prout, 1938
 オビカバナミシャク  — Eupithecia selinata fusei Inoue, 1980
 シコクカバナミシャク  — Eupithecia shikokuensis Inoue, 1980
 ソトカバナミシャク  — Eupithecia signigera Butler, 1879
 ナカアオナミシャク  — Eupithecia sophia Butler, 1878
 シロモンカバナミシャク  — Eupithecia spadix Inoue, 1955
 ナカオビカバナミシャク  — Eupithecia subbreviata Staudinger, 1897
 アキカバナミシャク  — Eupithecia subfumosa Inoue, 1965
 キナミウスグロナミシャク  — Eupithecia subfuscata ussuriensis Dietze, 1913
 シロオビカバナミシャク  — Eupithecia suboxydata Staudinger, 1897
 ハラキカバナミシャク  — Eupithecia subtacincta Hampson, 1895
 スジグロカバナミシャク  — Eupithecia supercastigata Inoue, 1958
 ハネナガカバナミシャク  — Eupithecia takao Inoue, 1955
 マダラカバスジナミシャク  — Eupithecia tantilloides Inoue, 1958
 トシマカバナミシャク  — Eupithecia tenuisquama (Warren, 1896)
 イイジマカバナミシャク  — Eupithecia thalictrata ijimai Inoue, 1963
 シロテンカバナミシャク  — Eupithecia tripunctaria Herrich-Schäffer, 1855
 ツシマカバナミシャク  — Eupithecia tsushimensis Inoue, 1980
 アルプスカバナミシャク  — Eupithecia veratraria perpaupera Inoue, 1965
 アザミカバナミシャク  — Eupithecia virgaureata invisa Butler, 1878
 ヤクシマカバナミシャク  — Eupithecia yakushimensis Inoue, 1980
 クロバネカバナミシャク  — Eupithecia zibellinata Christoph, 1881
 ナカジマチビナミシャク  — Casuariclystis latifascia (Walker, 1866)
 ホソバチビナミシャク  — Spiralisigna subpumilata (Inoue, 1972)
 イシガキチビナミシャク  — Eriopithex ishigakiensis (Inoue, 1971)
 マルバネチビナミシャク  — Gymnoscelis admixtaria (Walker, 1862)
 ウスチャイロチビナミシャク  — Gymnoscelis albicaudata Warren, 1897
 オガサワラチビナミシャク  — Gymnoscelis boninensis Inoue, 1994
 ウスムラサキチビナミシャク  — Gymnoscelis deleta (Hampson, 1891)
 ケブカチビナミシャク  — Gymnoscelis esakii Inoue, 1955
 ウラグロチビナミシャク  — Gymnoscelis melaninfra Inoue, 1994
 ウラジロチビナミシャク  — Gymnoscelis montgomeryi Inoue, 1994
 シタベニチビナミシャク  — Gymnoscelis semialbida (Walker, 1866)
 トベラクロスジナミシャク  — Gymnoscelis tristrigosa (Butler, 1880)
 ユリカチビナミシャク  — Gymnoscelis yurikae Inoue, 2002
 リンゴアオナミシャク  — Pasiphila rectangulata (Linnaeus, 1758)
 アトシロモンカバナミシャク  — Axinoptera anticostalis Galsworthy, 1999
 クロテンアオナミシャク  — Glaucoclystis azumai (Inoue, 1971)
 ミナミチビナミシャク  — Glaucoclystis satoi Inoue, 2002
 カギモンチビナミシャク  — Glaucoclystis spinosa (Inoue, 1971)
 ヒトスジチビナミシャク  — Bosara kadooriensis Galsworthy, 2003
 サキシマチビナミシャク  — Chloroclystis atypha Prout, 1958
 クロフウスアオナミシャク  — Chloroclystis consueta (Butler, 1879)
 ソトシロオビナミシャク  — Chloroclystis excisa (Butler, 1878)
 マダラアオナミシャク  — Chloroclystis hypopyrrha West, 1929
 チビアオナミシャク  — Chloroclystis kumakurai Inoue, 1958
 アマミアオナミシャク  — Chloroclystis neoconversa Inoue, 1971
 ハラアカウスアオナミシャク  — Chloroclystis obscura West, 1929
 ウラモンアオナミシャク  — Chloroclystis subcinctata Prout, 1915
 テンスジアオナミシャク  — Chloroclystis suspiciosa Inoue, 1982
 クロスジアオナミシャク  — Chloroclystis v-ata lucinda (Butler, 1879)
 オオサビイロナミシャク  — Collix ghosha ghosha Walker, 1862
 テングナミシャク  — Collix stellatus Warren, 1894
 トラノオナミシャク  — Anticollix sparsatus (Treitschke, 1828)
 アオスジナミシャク  — Echthrocollix minutus (Butler, 1881)
 マエフタテンナミシャク  — Herbulotia agilata (Christoph, 1881)
 トガリバナミシャク  — Horisme stratata (Wileman, 1911)
 アトシロナミシャク  — Horisme tersata tetricata (Guenée, 1857)
 ボタンヅルナミシャク  — Horisme vitalbata staudingeri Prout, 1938
 サビイロナミシャク  — Pseudocollix hyperythrus catalalia (Prout, 1958)
 クロテンサビイロナミシャク  — Pseudocollix kawamurai (Inoue, 1972)
 リュウキュウナカジロナミシャク  — Melanthia catenaria mesozona Prout, 1939
 ナカジロナミシャク北海道亜種  — Melanthia procellata inexpectata (Warnecke, 1938)
 ナカジロナミシャク本土北海道以外亜種  — Melanthia procellata inquinata (Butler, 1878)
 ナカジロナミシャク奄美亜種  — Melanthia procellata szechuanensis (Wehrli, 1941)

B